The Oxford Biography Index is an Oxford University Press (OUP) authority file. Although the index itself does not require registration, content linked from the index does. Originally a British national authority file based on the Oxford Dictionary of National Biography (Oxford DNB), it had been expanded to index some content from the American National Biography (ANB).

External links
  (no longer available)

Identifiers